On 1 May 2003, an election was held to elect councillors to the North Warwickshire Borough Council on the same day as other local elections in the UK. It was the first election to take place under the new ward boundaries, with one extra seat from the previous 34 seats added. All 35 seats were up for election and the result was no overall control with the Labour Party having the most seats at 16. The previous election had resulted in the council being controlled by Labour.

The election also resulted in an independent politician losing their seat and the Liberal Democrats gaining two seats, despite seeing a decrease in their vote share. The Conservative Party made significant gains, winning 6 seats and seeing a 4.9% increase in their vote share. Labour lost 6 seats and saw a 6% decrease in their vote share.

References

2003 English local elections
2003
2000s in Warwickshire